Kramer  is an occupational surname of Dutch or Low German origin or is derived from the High German surname Krämer ( or ).

In Middle Low German during the Late Middle Ages, Kramer meant " travelling merchant". The meaning later changed to "merchants trading with different rather small things".

People with this name

A
 Aaron Kramer (1921–1997), American poet, essayist, and translator
 Adolf Kramer (1871–1934), Silesian German chess master
 Alex Kramer (1903–1998), Canadian songwriter
 Amanda Kramer (born 1960s), American musician
 Andreas Kramer (born 1997), Swedish middle-distance runner 
 Ann-Kathrin Kramer (born 1966), German writer and actress
 Annemarie Kramer (born 1975), Dutch sprinter
 Alisha Kramer (born 1990), American physician and health activist
 Arlene Kramer Richards (born c. 1935), American psychoanalyst
 Arnold Kramer (1882–1976) was an American folk artist
 Arthur Kramer (1927–2008), American lawyer
 Arthur F. Kramer, American neuroscientist
 Arvid Kramer (born 1956), American basketball player

B
 Barry Kramer (born 1942), American basketball player and jurist
 Barry Kramer, former editor and occasional host of Game Grumps
 Ben Kramer (1913–99), American basketball player
 Benjamin F. Kramer (born 1957), U.S. (Maryland) politician
 Bert Kramer (1934–2001), American actor
 Bill Kramer (born 1965), U.S. (Wisconsin) politician
 Billy J. Kramer (born 1943), British merseybeat singer
 Boaz Kramer (born 1978), Israeli wheelchair tennis player
 Bob Kramer (born c. 1957), American knifesmith 
 Bryan Jared Kramer (born 1974), Member of Parliament for Madang Open, Papua New Guinea
 Bryan Jeffrey Kramer, American social media businessman
 Burton Kramer (born 1932), Canadian graphic designer and artist

C
 Cecilie Breil Kramer (born 1987), Danish football goalkeeper
 Charles Kramer (politician),  (1879–1943), Californian politician
 Charles Kramer (economist) (1907–1992), American economist, spy for the Soviet Union in the 1940s
 Charles Kramer (attorney) (1916–1988), lawyer from New York
 Charles Kramer (producer) (born 1970s), American television producer
 Chiel Kramer (born 1992), Dutch football goalkeeper
 Chris Kramer (actor) (born 1975), Canadian television actor
 Chris Kramer (born 1988), American basketball player in the Israel Basketball Premier League
 Christian Kramer (?–1834), German composer and musician at the British court
 Christina Kramer (born c. 1963), Canadian Slavic linguist 
 Christoph Kramer (born 1991), German footballer
 Clare Kramer (born 1974), American actress

D
 Daniel Kramer (born 1977), American stage and opera director
 David Kramer (singer) (born 1951), South African singer, songwriter, playwright and director
 David Kramer (soccer) (born 1972), American soccer goalkeeper
 David J. Kramer, United States Assistant Secretary of State for democracy, human rights, and labor, 2008–2009
 Dawn Kramer (born 1945), American choreographer and dancer
 Dean Kramer  (born 1952), American pianist
 Denise Kramer-Scholer (born 1910), Swiss fencer
 Dick Kramer (born 1972), Dutch cricketer
 Dieter Kramer (born 1959), German footballer
 Don Kramer (born 1969), American comics artist
 Don Kramer (politician) (born 1940), American politician
 Doug Kramer (born 1983), Filipino basketball player
 Doug Kramer (American football) (born 1998), American football player

E
 Eddie Kramer (born 1941), South African audio engineer and producer
 Edith Kramer (born 1916), Austrian artist
 Edmond Kramer (1906–1945), Swiss footballer
 Edna Kramer (1902–1984), American mathematician
 Edward E. Kramer (born 1961), American editor and author of science fiction, fantasy, and horror works
 Eiling Kramer (1914–1999), Canadian Politician
 Eitan Kramer (born 1978), American Vert Skater
 Eliyahu Kramer “Vilna Gaon” (born 1720) Lithuanian Rabbi, the genius of Vilna 
 Eric Allan Kramer (born 1962), American actor
 Erik Kramer (born 1964), American football quarterback
 Erwin Kramer (1902–1979), German politician

F
 Felix Kramer (born 1949), American founder of CalCars
 Ferdinand Kramer (1898–1985), German architect and functionalist designer
 Francisco Villagrán Kramer (1927–2011), Guatemalan legal scholar and politician
 Frank Kramer (artist) (1905–1993), American artist and illustrator
 Frank Kramer (director) (born 1925), a pseudonym of the Italian film director Gianfranco Parolini
 Frank Kramer (footballer, born 1972) (born 1972), German football player and coach
 Frank Louis Kramer (1880–1952), American cyclist and United States Bicycling Hall of Fame inductee
 Franz Kramer (1865–1924), United States Navy sailor

G
 Garret Kramer (born c. 1962), American mental performance coach
 George Kramer (philatelist), American philatelist
 George W. Kramer (1848–1938), American architect
 Georges Kramer (1898-?), Swiss football player and coach
 Gordon Kramer (1921–1989), Australian rules footballer
 Gorni Kramer (1913–1995), Italian songwriter, musician, and band leader
 Greg Kramer (1961–2013), British-born Canadian author, actor, director, and magician
 Gustav Kramer (1910–1959), German zoologist and ornithologist

H
 Haije Kramer (1917–2004), Dutch chess master and theoretician
 Harry Kramer (announcer) (1911–1996), American radio and television announcer
 Harry Kramer (German artist) (1925–1997), German artist
 Harry Kramer (American artist) (born 1939), American artist
 Heinrich Kramer a.k.a. Heinrich Institor (c. 1430 – 1505), Alsatian churchman and inquisitor
 Heinz Kramer (1925–1965), German sports shooter
 Hilaria Kramer (born 1967), Swiss jazz trumpeter and composer
 Hilton Kramer (1928–2012), American art critic

I
 Ida Kramer, (1877/1878 – 1930), American actress
 Iris Kramer (born 1981), German motorcycle trials rider

J
 Jack Kramer (baseball) (1918–1995), American baseball pitcher
 Jack Kramer (American football) (1919–1978), American football player
 Jack Kramer (1921–2009), American tennis player
 Jacob Kramer (1892–1962), Ukrainian-born painter in England
 Jana Kramer (born 1983), American actress
 Jane Kramer (born 1938), American journalist
 Jason Kramer (born c. 1970), American radio personality
 Jeffrey Kramer (born 1945), American film and television actor and producer
 Jens Kramer Mikkelsen (born 1951), Danish mayor of Copenhagen
 Jeroen Kramer (born 1967), Dutch photographer
 Jerry Kramer (born 1936), American professional football player
 Jessy Kramer (born 1990), Dutch team handball player
 Jim Kramer (born 1958), American Scrabble player
 Joan Whitney Kramer (1914–1990), American singer and songwriter
 Joel Kramer  (born 1955), American basketball player
 Joey Kramer (born 1950), American drummer with the musical group Aerosmith
 John Kramer (darts player) (born 1956), American darts player
 John R. Kramer (1937–2006), American law educator
 Jolly Kramer-Johansen (1902–1968), Norwegian composer
 Jonathan Kramer (1942–2004), American composer and music theorist
 Joris Kramer (born 1996), Dutch footballer
 Josef Kramer (1906–1945), German commandant of Bergen-Belsen concentration camp executed for war crimes

K
 Kane Kramer (born 1956), British inventor and businessman
 Ken Kramer (born 1942), American politician
 Kenny Kramer (born 1943), American stand-up comedian, on whom the Seinfeld character Cosmo Kramer was based
 Kent Kramer (born 1944), American professional football player
 Kent A. Kramer (born 1961), Iowan politician
 Kieran Kramer, American romance novelist

L
 Lance Kramer, an animation director on The Simpsons
 Larry Kramer (born 1935), American dramatist, author and gay rights activist
 Larry Kramer (American football) (born 1942), American football player and coach
 Larry Kramer (legal scholar) (born 1958), American legal scholar, dean of Stanford Law School
 Laura Shapiro Kramer (born 1948), American author, producer and film maker.
 Lawrence Kramer (musicologist) (born 1946), American musicologist
 Lawrence Francis Kramer (born 1933), American politician, two-time Mayor of Paterson, New Jersey
 Leah Kramer, American craftster, author, website programmer
 Leonie Kramer (born 1924), Australian academic and commentator
 Leopold Kramer (1869–1942), Austrian stage and film actor
 Lloyd Kramer (born 1947), American filmmaker
 Louis Kramer (1848–1922), American baseball executive
 Louise Kramer (born 1923), American sculptor
 Lud Kramer (1932–2004), U.S. politician in Washington State

M
 Mandel Kramer (1916–1989), American TV actor and voice actor
 Marcia Kramer (born 1948), American journalist
 Mariska Kramer (born 1974), Dutch triathlete
 Mark Kramer (jazz pianist) (born 1945), American jazz musician
 Mark Kramer (born 1958), American alternative rock musician and producer
 Mark Kramer (journalist), Mark William Kramer, an American journalist, author, professor, and editor.
 Martin Kramer (born 1954), American author on Islam and Arab politics
 Mary Kramer (born 1935), American (Iowa) politician
 Matt Kramer (musician) (born 1968), American singer formerly with rock band Saigon Kick
 Matt Kramer (wine writer), American wine writer
 Matthew Kramer (born 1959), American philosopher at the University of Cambridge
 Max Kramer (1903–1986), German scientist, developed Ruhrstahl X-4 missile (1943–1945)
 Michael Kramer (astronomer) (born 1967), German astronomer and astrophysicist
 Michael Kramer (narrator), American audiobook narrator
 Michael Eric Kramer, American film actor
 Michiel Kramer (born 1988), Dutch footballer
 Mike Kramer (born 1955), American football coach

N
 Nathaniel Kramer (born 1961), American filmmaker
 Nicole Kramer (born 1962), American swimmer

O
 Orin Kramer (born c. 1945), American hedge fund manager
 Oscar Kramer (1935–2010), Argentine film producer

P
Pascale Kramer (born 1961), Swiss author
 Paul J. Kramer (1904–1995), American biologist and plant physiologist.
 Paul Kramer (born 1933), U.S. (New Jersey) politician
 Perry Kramer (born 1959), U.S. motocross racer
 Peter Kramer (physicist) (born 1933), German physicist
 Peter Kramer (priest), German priest convicted of child abuse
 Peter D. Kramer (born 1948), American psychiatrist
 Philip Taylor Kramer (1952–1995), American physicist and bassist with the musical group Iron Butterfly
 Piet Kramer (1881–1961), Dutch architect

R
 Rachel Kramer (born 1980), Dutch singer
 Rachel Kramer Bussel (born 1975), American erotica writer
 Randy Kramer (born 1960), American baseball pitcher
 Rene Kramer (born 1987), German ice hockey player
 Rhonda Kramer, American air traffic reporter
 Richard Kramer (judge) (born 1947), American superior court judge
 Richard Kramer (writer) (born 1952), American screenwriter, novelist and television producer
 Richard J. Kramer (born 1963), American CEO of Goodyear Tire Co.
 Robert Kramer (1939–1999), American film director, screenwriter and actor
 Roger Kramer (b.~1939), Canadian football player
 Ron Kramer (1935–2010), American football player
 Rona E. Kramer (born 1954), Maryland politician
 Ronald Kramer (business) (born c. 1959), American businessman 
 Roy Kramer,  American college football coach and athletics administrator
 Rudolf Kramer (1886–?), Austrian road racing cyclist
 Rudolf Kramer (poultry expert) (1844–1904), German poultry expert
 Ruth Kramer (1926 –2015), All-American girls professional baseball league player

S
 Samuel Noah Kramer (1897–1990), Ukraine-born American historian and assyriologist
 Sarah Kramer (born 1968), Canadian cookbook author
 Shalom Kramer (1912–1978), Israeli essayist, editor, and literary critic
 Sherry Kramer, American playwright
 Shlomo Kramer, Israeli information technology entrepreneur
 Sidney B. Kramer (1915–2014), American publishing executive and literary agent
 Sidney Kramer (born 1925), American (Maryland) politician
 Stanley Kramer (1913–2001), American movie director and producer
 Stefan Kramer (impressionist) (born 1982), Chilean impressionist, actor, comedian and announcer
 Stella Kramer (born 1989), German handball player
 Stepfanie Kramer (born 1956), American actress and singer
 Steve Kramer (basketball) (born 1945), American basketball player
 Steve Kramer (actor) (born 1948), American voice actor
 Susan Kramer (born 1950), English politician, Liberal Democrat member of parliament
 Sven Kramer (born 1986), Dutch speed skater

T
 Theodor Kramer (1897–1958), Austrian poet
 Theodore L. Kramer (1847–1910), American Civil War soldier 
 Thomas Kramer (born 1957), German-born real estate developer and venture capitalist
 Tim Kramer (1952 or 1958 – 1992), American porn star
 Tom Kramer (born 1968), American baseball pitcher
 Tommy Kramer (born 1955), American football quarterback
 Tosca Kramer (1903–1976), New Zealand-born American violinist and violist
 Trey Kramer (born 1988), American football player

V
 Vjekoslav Kramer (born 1976), Bosnian television chef

W
 Walter R. Kramer (1914–1995), U.S. badminton champion
 Wayne Kramer (guitarist) (born 1948), American musician with the group MC5
 Wayne Kramer (filmmaker) (born 1965), South African screenwriter and film director
 Wilhelm Kramer (1801–1876), German otologist
 Wilhelm Heinrich Kramer (died 1765), German-born Austrian Hungarian botanist, physician and military surgeon
 William M. Kramer (1920–2004), American rabbit and art collector
 Wolfgang Kramer (born 1942), German game designer

Y
 Yep Kramer (born 1957), Dutch speed skater

Fictional people
 Bernard Kramer, founder of Kramer Associates in Robert Sobel's alternate history novel For Want of a Nail
 Chas Kramer, a character played by Shia LaBeouf in the 2005 film Constantine (film)
 Cosmo Kramer, a character in the television series Seinfeld
 Jens Kramer, character on the German soap opera Verbotene Liebe
 John Kramer (Saw), a fictional character in the Saw film series; also known as Jigsaw
 Lisa Kramer, a character played by Debra Messing in the 2004 American romantic comedy film Along Came Polly
 Margaux Kramer, a character played by Ami Foster in the television sitcom Punky Brewster
 Rex Kramer, Danger Seeker, a character in the 1977 American comedy film The Kentucky Fried Movie
 Rex Kramer, a character in the 1980 American comedy film Airplane!
 Tromp Kramer, Afrikaner Detective in James McClure's Kramer and Zondi novels
 Ted, Joanna, and Billy Kramer, characters in the 1979 American drama film Kramer vs. Kramer portrayed by Dustin Hoffman, Meryl Streep, and Justin Henry

Kramers
Hendrik Anthony "Hans" Kramers (1894–1952), Dutch physicist, known for Kramers' law, Kramers' opacity law, Kramers theorem, Kramers–Heisenberg formula, Kramers–Kronig relations, and Kramers–Wannier duality.

See also
 Cramer (surname)
 Cremer surname
 Krämer, surname
 Krammer (surname)
 Kraemer (surname)
 Krahmer, surname
 Kremer, surname
 Krmar, surname
 Kramarz

Occupational surnames
Dutch-language surnames
Jewish surnames
Low German surnames

nl:Kramer